The Children's Art Project at The University of Texas MD Anderson Cancer Center is a non-profit initiative that benefits patients in the Children’s Cancer Hospital at The University of Texas MD Anderson Cancer Center in Houston, Texas. Marketing and sales of products based on the artwork of these young patients fund programs that support their educational, emotional and recreational needs.

The artwork appears on seasonal notecards and a variety of gift items that are sold worldwide. Over the past 37 years, product sales have returned nearly $27 million to enhance patient services and patient-centered research at MD Anderson.

History
The Children’s Art Project (CAP) started with an MD Anderson volunteer’s observation about the quality of a young cancer patients’ art being “as pretty as a Christmas card.” In 1973, a few volunteers began work on the project by selling the artwork as Christmas cards to MD Anderson employees.

The program’s name changed from the Children’s Christmas Card Project to the Children’s Art Project in 1995 to reflect the expanded scope of selling cards and products throughout the year. While CAP now has a small full-time paid staff, approximately 90% of the project work is accomplished by volunteers.

Artwork Production
A coordinator and several art volunteers teach weekly art classes to patients in the Children’s Cancer Hospital. The patients are instructed in a variety of mediums including watercolor, paint, clay, colored markers and pencils, and collage techniques.

The artwork is archived by category and is kept active for many years. Because the inventory is extensive, it is possible to go back and pull out a design that has been waiting for several years to be used in the market.

Development of products is based on suggestions from customers, volunteers, staff and trends in the marketplace. The Children’s Art Project conducts consumer market research, using test marketing and focus groups to help determine final product selections.

Product Sales
Children’s Art Project cards and gifts are sold in more than 2,000 retail outlets throughout Texas, Louisiana and Florida, with some locations in other states. Retailers who carry the products consider this a community service and make no profit.

In addition to retail outlets, the Children’s Art Project attends off-site shows and holds trunk show events in private homes to introduce a community to MD Anderson and CAP. Products also are sold in MD Anderson gift shops and through consignees.

CAP mails more than 700,000 catalogs and ships more than 16,000 packages a year. The direct mail portion of sales is supported by a database of about 85,000 individuals and corporations.

In addition to an online store, the Children’s Art Project Boutique located in the Uptown Park Shopping Center in Houston sells a full line of CAP products.

Support Programs
Purchases from the Children’s Art Project help support programs that enable children to continue to enjoy their lives:

Child Life Program — Child Life specialists provide therapeutic play activities and offer emotional support, offering each child understanding and a sense of control of their medical treatment. They also plan and implement daily activities and recreational programs to normalize the patients’ lives in the hospital and in the outpatient clinic.
Educational Programs — During treatment, young patients continue their education in hospital-based classrooms and through the Continuing Learning Activities in Summer Session (CLASS) program with tutoring and educational field trips. The School Liaison and English as a Second Language programs complement classroom education.
College and Graduate School Scholarships — Current and former patients may receive scholarship funds for college and graduate school.
Summer Camps — Young cancer patients and their siblings have the opportunity to attend Camp Star Trails for ages 5–12 or Camp A.O.K. (Anderson’s Older Kids) for ages 13–18, both overnight summer camp programs. Campers enjoy traditional activities of summer camp, while having their medical needs taken care of.
Ski Trip — Physically challenged patients travel to the mountains and learn how they can overcome their physical limitations on the ski slopes and build self-esteem. They are accompanied by physicians, nurses, Child Life specialists and volunteers.
Pediatric Parties — Magicians, musicians and other guests provide a welcome diversion from clinic appointments and hospital stays.
Writing and Musical Therapy — These educational programs encourage young patients to express themselves, while enhancing their self-esteem. From improving communication skills to providing emotional release and enhancing academic performance, these therapy programs are a means of group interaction, self-expression and entertainment.
Other Patient-Focused Programs — Funds from CAP sales support a variety of other patient-focused programs, from pediatric parent dinners to rehabilitation guides to pediatric bereavement programs.

References

External links 
 Children's Art Project
 Corpus Christi Caller-Times: Art Project Means Guests and Goodies
 Houston Chronicle: Lazy Gardener - I Dare You to Read This Children's Book

Organizations based in Houston